The 1987 Weber State Wildcats football team represented Weber State University as a member of the Big Sky Conference during the 1987 NCAA Division I-AA football season. Led by seventh-year head coach Mike Price and junior quarterback Jeff Carlson, the Wildcats compiled an overall record of 10–3 with a mark of 7–1 in conference play, placing second in the Big Sky behind the conference champion, Idaho. For the first time, Weber State was invited to the NCAA Division I-AA Football Championship playoffs, where they defeated the aforementioned Vandals in the first round before falling in the quarterfinal round to Marshall.

Schedule

References

Weber State
Weber State Wildcats football seasons
Weber State Wildcats football